Lesesne State Forest is a Virginia state forest located in Nelson County.  Its  are dedicated to the preservation of the American chestnut and to wildlife management activities.  It is open to the public during daylight hours.

External links 
Virginia state forests

Virginia state forests
Protected areas of Nelson County, Virginia
1968 establishments in Virginia
Protected areas established in 1968